Shanjur (also Romanized as Shanjūr) is a village in Darjazin-e Olya Rural District, Qorveh-e Darjazin District, Razan County, Hamadan Province, Iran. At the 2006 census, its population was 561, in 135 families.

References 

Populated places in Razan County